The Tony Danza Show is an American sitcom television series starring Tony Danza, Majandra Delfino, Dean Stockwell, Ashley Malinger, Maria Canals, and Shaun Weiss that aired on NBC from September 24 to December 10, 1997, during the 1997 fall lineup. The show aired 5 episodes before being cancelled, leaving 9 episodes unaired.

Tony Danza won "Favorite Male Performer In A New TV Series" at the 24th People's Choice Awards for his performance in the show.

Premise
Tony DiMeo (Danza), single father of two daughters, is a sportswriter who can't use a computer. Tina (Delfino) is a rebellious 16-year-old and Mickey (Malinger) is an 11-year-old hypochondriac.

Cast
 Tony Danza as Tony DiMeo
 Maria Canals as Carmen Cruz	
 Shaun Weiss as Stuey Mandelker	
 Majandra Delfino as Tina DiMeo
 Ashley Malinger as Mickey DiMeo	
 Dean Stockwell as Frank DiMeo

Episodes

References

External links

1990s American sitcoms
1997 American television series debuts
1997 American television series endings
NBC original programming
English-language television shows
Television series about families
Television series by Universal Television
Television series by Sony Pictures Television
Television shows set in New York City